The St. Mary River (sometimes represented as the St. Mary's River) is a river in the East Kootenay region of British Columbia.  It rises in the Purcell Mountains and flows in a generally southeasterly direction to its confluence with the Kootenay River at Fort Steele, British Columbia.

References

Rivers of British Columbia
East Kootenay
Tributaries of the Kootenay River
Kootenay Land District